Telioneura fuliginosa is a moth in the subfamily Arctiinae. It was described by Rothschild in 1910. It is found in the Amazon region.

References

Natural History Museum Lepidoptera generic names catalog

Moths described in 1910
Arctiinae